Six Days Before the Flood is the title of the third live album by singer-songwriter Judie Tzuke, released in 2000.

Track listing
 "Welcome to the Cruise" (Tzuke, Mike Paxman) (from Welcome to the Cruise)
 "Living on the Coast" (Tzuke, Paxman) (from Sports Car)
 "On Days Like These" (Tzuke, David P. Goodes) (later released in 2001 on Queen Secret Keeper)
 "The One That Got Away" (Tzuke, Goodes, Peter Cox) (later released in 2001 on Queen Secret Keeper)
 "Secret Agent" (Tzuke, Bob Noble) (from Secret Agent)
 "That's Where My Heart Used To Be" (Tzuke, Peter Gordeno) (from Secret Agent)
 "I Don't Believe in Miracles" (Russ Ballard)
 "All of Me" (Tzuke, Goodes, Cox, Paul Muggleton) (later released in 2001 on Queen Secret Keeper)
 "Bully" (Tzuke, Goodes) (from Secret Agent)
 "Understanding" (Tzuke, Paxman) (from Sports Car)
 "Sports Car" (Tzuke, Paxman) (from Sports Car)
 "One Minute" (Tzuke, Brandon Fownes) (later released in 2001 on Queen Secret Keeper)

Personnel
Judie Tzuke - vocals
David P. Goodes - guitar
Dale Davis - bass
Ali Kane - keyboards, backing vocals
Stephen Darrell Smith - keyboards, backing vocals.
Paul Beavis - drums
Mia Silverman - percussion, backing vocals
Jamie Muggleton - backing vocals on "Bully"

References
Official website

Judie Tzuke albums
1999 live albums